Charles H. Braun Stadium is a baseball venue in Evansville, Indiana, US.  It is home to the Evansville Purple Aces baseball team of the Division I Missouri Valley Conference. The stadium's capacity is 1,200 spectators, much of which consists of chair-backed seating.

The venue is named for Charles H. Braun, an Evansville businessman who died in 1998.  Braun's sons, Alan and Charles, Jr., are both involved in the University, Alan as trustee and Charles, Jr. as a former golf coach.

Braun Stadium features the Marv and Edie Bates press box.  Marv Bates was a broadcaster of Evansville sports.  Both he and his wife supported Aces athletics.

Prior to Braun Stadium's opening in 1999, Evansville played at Bosse Field from 1985 to 1998.

See also
 List of NCAA Division I baseball venues

References

College baseball venues in the United States
Baseball venues in Indiana
Evansville Purple Aces baseball